Shahnshahr and Suburbs Bus Organization is a public transport agency running Transit buses in Shahinshahr and Gaz, Shahin Shahr and Meymeh County, located north of Isfahan, in Greater Isfahan Region, Central Iran.

Routes

References

Bus transport in Iran
Transportation in Isfahan Province
Shahin Shahr and Meymeh County
Transport in Isfahan